Pacific Royale Airways ceased operation in 2012. Below are the destinations that were served by Pacific Royale Airways:

List

References 

Destinations
Pacific Royale